The Toyota Trailer T10 was a trailer manufactured by Toyota that was designed to go behind the Toyota Land Cruiser or the Toyota Weapon Carrier using a ring hitch.

References 

Trailer T10
Trailers